The men's triple jump event at the 1969 European Indoor Games was held on 9 March in Belgrade.

Results

References

Triple jump at the European Athletics Indoor Championships
Triple